The canton of Vallées de l'Ousse et du Lagoin is an administrative division of the Pyrénées-Atlantiques department, southwestern France. It was created at the French canton reorganisation which came into effect in March 2015. Its seat is in Pontacq.

It consists of the following communes:
 
Aast
Angaïs
Barzun
Baudreix
Bénéjacq
Beuste
Boeil-Bezing
Bordères
Bordes
Coarraze
Espoey
Ger
Gomer
Hours
Igon
Labatmale
Lagos
Lestelle-Bétharram
Limendous
Livron
Lourenties
Lucgarier
Mirepeix
Montaut
Nousty
Ponson-Dessus
Pontacq
Saint-Vincent
Soumoulou

References

Cantons of Pyrénées-Atlantiques